The 2019 African Judo Championships was the 40th edition of the African Judo Championships, organised by the African Judo Union. It took place in Cape Town, South Africa from 25–28 April 2019.

Medal overview

Men

Women

Medal table

Participating nations
There were a total of 179 participants from 28 nations.

References

External links
 

African Judo Championships
African Judo Championships
African Judo Championships
African Judo Championships